Quenamari (possibly from in the Aymara or Quechua spelling Qinamari) is a  mountain in the Vilcanota mountain range in the Andes of Peru. It is located in the Cusco Region, Canchis Province, Checacupe District. Quenamari lies southwest of the glaciated area of Quelccaya (Quechua for "snow plain"): It is situated between a mountain named Comercocha in the north and Cuzcoccahuarina in the south, north of the Llanca Mayo.

References

Mountains of Peru
Mountains of Cusco Region